Show Tunes is a 1989 album by Rosemary Clooney, of show tunes.

Track listing
 "I Wish I Were in Love Again" (Lorenz Hart, Richard Rodgers) – 3:07
 "Manhattan" (Hart, Rodgers) – 5:18
 "I Stayed Too Long at the Fair" (Billy Barnes) – 4:42
 "Ev'rything I've Got" (Hart, Rodgers) – 5:06
 "How Are Things in Glocca Morra?" (Yip Harburg, Burton Lane) – 5:06
 "Come Back to Me" (Lane, Alan Jay Lerner) – 4:59
 "Where Do You Start?" (Alan Bergman, Marilyn Bergman, Johnny Mandel) – 2:58
 "Taking a Chance on Love" (Vernon Duke, Ted Fetter, John La Touche) – 3:28
 "I'll See You Again" (Noël Coward) – 3:26
 "All the Things You Are" (Oscar Hammerstein II, Jerome Kern) – 3:44
 "Guys and Dolls" (Frank Loesser) – 4:43
 "My Ship" (Ira Gershwin, Kurt Weill) – 3:12

Personnel
 Rosemary Clooney – vocals
 Warren Vaché Jr. – cornet
 Scott Hamilton – tenor saxophone
 John Oddo – piano
 John Clayton – bass 
 Jeff Hamilton  – drums

Source:

References

1989 albums
Rosemary Clooney albums
Concord Records albums